"Que Se Joda" is a song by Puerto Rican rapper Anuel AA and Puerto Rican singers Farruko and Zion and was released on May 29, 2020, as the eighth single from his second studio album Emmanuel.

Music video
The video was released on June 25, 2020, and has so far received over 162 million views on YouTube. The visual is an explosion of summer fun including jet skis, off-road driving, a luxury yacht cruise and an afternoon at a water park.

Charts

References

2020 singles
Anuel AA songs
Farruko songs